Cristoforo Solari (c. 1460–1527), also known as il Gobbo (the hunchbacked), was an Italian sculptor and architect. He was the brother of the painter Andrea Solari.

Among his work, one of the most famous is the tomb of the dukes Ludovico il Moro and Beatrice d'Este for the Certosa di Pavia,  carved between 1497 and 1499.

For a while people thought he had sculpted the Pietà, causing Michelangelo to break into the church and chisel his name on it.

Some of Solari's work can be found at the Metropolitan Museum of Art in New York, the Museum of Fine Arts in Boston, the Daniel Katz Gallery in London, the Victoria & Albert Museum in London and multiple other locations across the world.

References

External links
Cristofoto Solari on Artcyclopedia
A collection of pictures of Ludovico's grave

1460 births
1527 deaths
15th-century Italian architects
16th-century Italian architects
15th-century Italian sculptors
Italian male sculptors
16th-century Italian sculptors
Architects from Milan
Italian Renaissance architects
Year of birth uncertain